Anthony Bewley (May 22, 1804 – September 13, 1860) was an abolitionist pastor who was lynched in Fort Worth, Texas for his anti-slavery views.

Bewley was born in Tennessee and became a minister for the Methodist Episcopal Church as a young man.  After serving in Virginia and marrying his wife Jane Winton, the Bewleys moved to Missouri.  In 1844, the church split over the issue of slavery, with Bewley rejecting the move of the Missouri church to join the pro-slavery Methodist Episcopal Church, South.

In 1858, the Bewleys and their children moved to Johnson City, Texas, west of Austin.  Later the next year, the Bewleys fled when pro-slavery activists disrupted a church conference.  The Bewleys returned, however, in spring 1860.

That year, as pro-slavery  Texans sought out those who might harbor abolitionist sympathies, newspapers published an alleged letter to Bewley where another minister encouraged him to promote abolitionism.  Bewley denied that the letter was authentic, but, fearing for his life, he fled for Kansas.  Bewley departed under cover of darkness the same day that a mob lynched Unionist William Crawford. A posse chased him, and brought him back to Fort Worth on September 13. 1860.  That same evening, a mob descended on the jail, seized him, and hung him from a nearby tree.

Following his lynching, Bewley was placed in a shallow grave.  As his bones became exposed, a local merchant displayed the bones on the roof of his warehouse.

References

1804 births
1860 deaths
People from Tennessee